The Palm Springs Aerial Tramway Mountain Station, also known as Palm Springs Aerial Tramway Alpine Station, is a historic building located in Mount San Jacinto State Park near Idyllwild, California. The building is a fine example of a commercial building designed by Palm Springs architect E. Stewart Williams for the Palm Springs Aerial Tramway. The three-story structure follows a Y-plan with its main elevation to the north. The building's lower levels, which contains the tram's mechanical equipment and receives the tramway cars, are composed of reinforced concrete. The upper level is mostly composed of wood and glass. A concrete wrap-around viewing deck is found on the north and east elevations, and a wood staircase descends to the mountain hiking paths. The interior features a cocktail lounge, dining room, and fireplaces. The building was listed on the National Register of Historic Places in 2016.

References

Commercial buildings completed in 1963
Modernist architecture in California
Transportation buildings and structures on the National Register of Historic Places in California
National Register of Historic Places in Riverside County, California
E. Stewart Williams buildings
1963 establishments in California